Paraspelobia is a genus of flies belonging to the family Lesser Dung flies.

Species
P. vlasovi (Duda, 1938)

References

Sphaeroceridae
Diptera of Asia
Taxa named by Oswald Duda
Brachycera genera